Lucilia is a genus of South American flowering plants in the tribe Gnaphalieae within the family Asteraceae.

Species
The following species are recognised:
 Lucilia acutifolia Cass.
 Lucilia conoidea Wedd. 
 Lucilia ferruginea Baker 
 Lucilia kunthiana (DC.) Zardini  
 Lucilia linearifolia Baker  
 Lucilia lycopodioides (Less.) S.E.Freire  
 Lucilia nitens Less.  
 Lucilia recurva Wedd.  
 Lucilia saxatilis V.M.Badillo  
 Lucilia tomentosa Wedd.

References

Asteraceae genera
Gnaphalieae
Flora of South America